Grand Portage River may refer to:

 Rivière du Grand Portage, Saguenay–Lac-Saint-Jean, Quebec, Canada
 Grand Portage South-East River, a tributary of rivière du Grand Portage
 Grand Portage South-West River, a tributary of rivière du Grand Portage

See also
 Grand Portage–Pigeon River Border Crossing
 Grand Portage of the Saint Louis River
 Grand Portage (disambiguation)